Mohammad Noman is a political leader of the Jatiya Party in Bangladesh. He was elected a member of parliament from the Lakshmipur-2 constituency in the 2019 national election.

References

Living people
Jatiya Party politicians
Year of birth missing (living people)
Place of birth missing (living people)
10th Jatiya Sangsad members